108th Regiment of Foot may refer to:
108th Regiment of Foot (1761), raised in 1761
108th Regiment of Foot (1794), raised in 1794
108th (Madras Infantry) Regiment of Foot, raised by the East India Company and placed on the British establishment as the 108th Foot in 1862